EURES (European Employment Services) is a cooperation network formed by public employment services.
It is an agency of the EU set up to facilitate employment mobility among the member states
and it maintains a database of jobs as a useful means to search and apply for jobs in the EU, EEA and Switzerland.

Notes

External links 
 EURES Network, Europa.eu

Regional policies of the European Union
Institutions of the European Union
Recruitment